Serhiy Rysenko is a Ukrainian cross-country mountain biker. He competed at the 2000 Olympics where he finished in 27th place, at the 2004 Olympics where he finished in 36th place, at the 2008 Olympics where he finished in 42nd place and at the 2012 Summer Olympics, he competed in the Men's cross-country at Hadleigh Farm, finishing in 31st place.

References

Ukrainian male cyclists
Cross-country mountain bikers
1980 births
Living people
Olympic cyclists of Ukraine
Cyclists at the 2000 Summer Olympics
Cyclists at the 2004 Summer Olympics
Cyclists at the 2008 Summer Olympics
Cyclists at the 2012 Summer Olympics
Sportspeople from Luhansk
Cyclists at the 2015 European Games
European Games competitors for Ukraine
21st-century Ukrainian people